The Bym is a river in Perm Krai, Russia, a left tributary of the Iren, which in turn is a tributary of the Sylva. Main tributaries: Bymok (right).

References 

Rivers of Perm Krai